Willemijn Margaretha Duyster (born 5 April 1970 in Amsterdam, North Holland) is a former Dutch field hockey defender, who played 87 international matches for the Dutch national team, in which she scored no goals.

A player from HGC in the 1990s, she competed at the 1996 Summer Olympics, winning the bronze medal under the guidance of coach Tom van 't Hek. At the same Olympic tournament in Atlanta, Georgia her brother Jeroen won the gold medal with the men's rowing eights.

References
  KNHB Profile

External links
 

1970 births
Living people
Dutch female field hockey players
Female field hockey defenders
Olympic field hockey players of the Netherlands
Field hockey players at the 1996 Summer Olympics
Olympic bronze medalists for the Netherlands
Field hockey players from Amsterdam
Olympic medalists in field hockey
Medalists at the 1996 Summer Olympics
HGC players
20th-century Dutch women
21st-century Dutch women